City Yangon Football Club is a Myanmar football club founded in 2012 by Omer Celik. Originating from Horizon International Schools, the team switched to full Professional Club status and contested the MNL-2. At the end of 2016 Myanmar National League, they relegated to MNL-2. At the end of the 2016 MNL season, Horizon name changed to City Yangon.
The team has been dethroned after competition of 2017 MNL-2 season due to financial difficulty.

Current squad

References
 Horizon Website in Burmese

External links
 First Eleven Journal in Burmese
 Soccer Myanmar in Burmese

Football clubs in Myanmar
Association football clubs established in 2009
Myanmar National League clubs
2009 establishments in Myanmar